Stade Jean-Bouin may refer to:

 Stade Jean-Bouin (Angers), former name of the Stade Raymond Kopa from 1968 to 2017
Stade Jean-Bouin (Choisy-le-Roi), stadium in Choisy-le-Roi
Stade Jean-Bouin (Évreux), stadium in Évreux
Stade Jean-Bouin (Issy-les-Moulineaux), stadium in Issy-les-Moulineaux
Stade Jean-Bouin (Joué-lès-Tours), stadium in Joué-lès-Tours
 , stadium in Marseille (part of the )
 Stade Jean-Bouin (Nîmes), stadium in Nîmes
 Stade Jean-Bouin (Paris), stadium in Paris
Stade Jean-Bouin (Saint-Priest), stadium in Sant-Priest